Vellmar is a town in the Kassel district, in Hesse, Germany. It is located on the Ahne river.

History
Vellmar gained city rights on August 30, 1975 to mark its 1200th anniversary, becoming, together with Baunatal, the youngest city in the district of Kassel. Between 1975 and the mid-1980s, the centre of the city with the town hall, shops and medical-centre, and the residential area of Musikerviertel, was built. The river Ahne that runs through the city is the namesake for the Ahnepark local recreation area, built in 1986.

Vellmar consists of four districts: , Niedervellmar,  and Vellmar-West.

Transportation
The traffic infrastructure of Vellmar consists of two railway stations – Obervellmar and Niedervellmar - and the B 7 road. A connection with the Kassel tram system is currently under construction.

International relations

Vellmar is twinned with:
  Zell am See (Austria)
  Bewdley (United Kingdom)
  Szigetszentmárton (Hungary)

References

External links
  

Kassel (district)